Katarina Van Derham (born Katarina Ambrusova on 11 December 1975) is a Slovak-American model, actress, and publisher.  Van Derham is best known for being the longest-serving St. Pauli Girl, playing Bob Saget's girlfriend on Entourage, and being the founder of Viva Glam Magazine.

Early life
Van Derham was born in Slovakia.  She has one brother. Van Derham came to the United States in 1998 at the age of 22 with only $500 in her pocket.  Van Derham has been a vegetarian since she was 18 and became a vegan when she was 34.

Van Derham was briefly married to Los Angeles native James Michael Bilella, aka James Van Der Ham, which is how she acquired her surname.   Since she is a vegan, she often jokes that she did not want the word “ham” to stand alone so she changed the spelling of her last name to Van Derham.

Modeling
Van Derham's modeling career started in 2002, at the age of 26, when she was discovered by a photographer while working as a waitress in Santa Monica.  Van Derham has appeared in over 20 national and international print and TV commercials and over 60 front covers of magazines.  Van Derham has also been a spokesmodel for a number of products. Van Derham is the longest-serving St. Pauli Girl with her two year reign.  Van Derham was initially chosen using a reader's poll on the Maxim website in 2009. Van Derham also played the Snow Queen in advertisements for Coors beer.  Van Derham has been voted one of the 100 sexiest women in the world by magazines on 3 different continents.

Acting
Van Derham played Bob Saget's girlfriend in one episode of Entourage.  Van Derham also appears in the movie Unbelievable!!!!! as Captain Cheryl Stillwood.

Viva Glam Magazine
In 2012, Van Derham founded Viva Glam Magazine, an online magazine. Its content includes articles on fashion, beauty, wellness, travel, entertainment, and food. VIVA GLAM Magazine supports an ethical lifestyle. It is inspired by classic glamour and old Hollywood, but with an emphasis on modern conscious living. By September 2016, Viva Glam had 4.5 million views a month.

VIVA GLAM Magazine received its first significant news coverage in 2012 when it gave its Sexiest Power Woman of All Time award to model manager Nadja Atwal. In the summer of 2013, the magazine released their first print issue with Canadian Guess model Ashley Diana Morris on the cover. This was the first official cover and this issue was free.

The 90s Girl is a docu-series produced by VIVA GLAM Magazine. It is an intimate look into Van Derham's life and the lives of the VIVA GLAM Magazine team. It airs Wednesdays on the VIVA GLAM Magazine website and YouTube. The average airtime is 20 minutes.  Eight episodes have been released.  The 90s Girl premiered in 2017.

In 2018, Van Derham started producing a web series called MODELS Talk, which is hosted by Candace Kita and Van Derham.  MODELS Talk interviews models on their experiences in the industry.

Cosmetics
Katarina Van Derham launched a liquid lipstick collection “Glamour Garden” Limited Edition Lipstick Collection on February 1, 2018. She teamed up with cosmetic brand, LA Splash, to create a four-color liquid lipstick collection made up of original colors.  The four colors included in Katarina’s collection are:  Fashioniser, a classic nude, 90s Girl, a dusty rose, Katarina- a peachy-pink and Glamarella, a hot fuchsia lip color.

Filmography

Film

Television

References

External links

 
 Viva Glam Magazine official website
 

Slovak female models
Slovak actresses
Living people
1975 births
People from Ružomberok District